The 1956–57 Football League season was Birmingham City Football Club's 54th in the Football League and their 30th in the First Division. They finished in 12th position in the 22-team division. They entered the 1956–57 FA Cup at the third round proper and lost in the semi-final to Manchester United. In the inaugural edition of the Inter-Cities Fairs Cup, Birmingham finished top of their group so progressed to the semi-final.

Twenty-four players made at least one appearance in nationally organised first-team competition, and there were thirteen different goalscorers. Goalkeeper Gil Merrick played in 49 of the 51 first-team matches over the season, and Alex Govan finished as leading goalscorer with 30 goals in all competitions, of which 24 were scored in the league.

Football League First Division

League table (part)

FA Cup

Inter-Cities Fairs Cup

The last two group matches of the inaugural season of the Inter-Cities Fairs Cup were completed during this season, as a result of which Birmingham qualified for the semi-finals, in which they were to play Barcelona the following season.

Appearances and goals

Numbers in parentheses denote appearances as a substitute.
Players with name struck through and marked  left the club during the playing season.

See also
Birmingham City F.C. seasons

References
General
 
 
 Source for match dates and results: 
 Source for lineups, appearances, goalscorers and attendances: Matthews (2010), Complete Record, pp. 348–49, 473.
 Source for kit: "Birmingham City". Historical Football Kits. Retrieved 22 May 2018.

Specific

Birmingham City F.C. seasons
Birmingham City